Maracanã Station, formerly known as Derby Club Station, is a railway station in Maracanã, Rio de Janeiro which services the Maracanã Stadium. The station is serviced by the Rio de Janeiro Metro and SuperVia.

References

Metrô Rio stations
SuperVia stations